Ezequiel Baeza (born 8 May 1944) is a Chilean long-distance runner. He competed in the marathon at the 1968 Summer Olympics.

References

1944 births
Living people
Athletes (track and field) at the 1968 Summer Olympics
Chilean male long-distance runners
Chilean male marathon runners
Olympic athletes of Chile
Sportspeople from Santiago
20th-century Chilean people